"We Do It" is a song written by Russell Stone, who was the male half of the husband and wife duo R&J Stone. It was produced by Phil Swern, and became a hit in 1976, peaking at No. 5 on the UK Singles Chart. It was also a top 5 hit in Australia. 

It was re-released in 1987 on Soul City Records.

Carol Douglas, who had a hit with "Doctors Orders" in 1974, also recorded her version of "We Do It" in 1977.

Releases
 "We Do It" / "We Love Each Other" - RCA Records 2616 (1976, UK)
 R & J Stone  - "We Do It" (12" Mix) / Cee Jay PeaeS - "We've Gone and Done It Now", R&J Stone - "We Do It" (7" Mix) - Soul City Records SITY T3 (1987, UK)
 R&J Stone - "We Do It" / Kandidate - "I Don't Wanna Lose You" - Old Gold OG 9684

Charts

Weekly charts

Year-end charts

References

External links
 "We Do It" by R&J Stone
 "We Do It By Carol Douglas

1976 songs
1976 debut singles
RCA Records singles
Male–female vocal duets